The Department of Public Safety of the State of Missouri, commonly known as the Missouri Department of Public Safety (DPS), is a department of the state government of Missouri.

The agency is headquartered at 1101 Riverside Drive in Jefferson City.

Divisions
DPS is divided into ten divisions & (including two commissions) :

 Office of the Director
 Alcohol and Tobacco Control
 Missouri Capitol Police
 Missouri Division of Fire Safety 
 Missouri State Highway Patrol 
 State Emergency Management Agency
 Missouri Veterans Commission
 Missouri Gaming Commission

Office of the Director

The Office of the Director provides administrative support for the Department of Public Safety, provides support services and
resources to assist local law enforcement agencies, and provides training criteria and licensing for law enforcement officers. The
office also administers the Homeland Security Program and state and federal funds in grants for juvenile justice, victims' assistance,
law enforcement, and narcotics control.

Division of Alcohol and Tobacco Control

The Division of Alcohol and Tobacco Control is responsible for alcoholic beverage excise tax collection, liquor licensing along with
liquor and tobacco enforcement, and providing training to licensees in these areas.

Missouri State Highway Patrol

The Missouri State Highway Patrol Division is responsible for law enforcement on state highways and waterways, criminal investigations,
criminal laboratory analysis, motor vehicle and commercial vehicle inspections, boat inspections, and public education about safety
issues.

Missouri Capitol Police

The Capitol Police serve as the primary law enforcement agency for the capitol complex, as well as other state buildings in Jefferson City, patrolling the buildings and grounds 24 hours a day, seven days a week.

Missouri Division of Fire Safety

The Division of Fire Safety provides training and certification to firefighters and emergency response personnel, investigates fires
across the state, and has responsibilities related to the safety of fireworks, elevators, explosives, amusements rides, day care centers, and boilers.

Missouri Veterans Commission

The Veterans Commission employs over 1,500 employees and provides veteran services to over 500,000 Missouri veterans. Its function is to provide nursing care at seven state veterans' homes; provide burial at five state
veteran cemeteries; and provide veteran benefits assistance through veteran service officers and grant partners.

Missouri Gaming Commission

The Missouri Gaming Commission regulates charitable gaming (BINGO), riverboat casino gaming, and fantasy sports contests.

State Emergency Management Agency

The State Emergency Management Agency helps Missourians prepare for, respond to, and recover from disasters, including
coordinating state disaster response and working with local, federal, and nongovernmental partners to develop state emergency plans.

Organization
The Director of the Missouri Department of Public Safety is appointed by the Governor of Missouri. must be confirmed by the Missouri Senate The director is assisted in managing the Department by one deputy director and several division directors. 

 Director
 Deputy Director 
 Administrative, Fiscal and Legal Services Division
 Homeland Security Division
 Missouri Capitol Police
 Office of the Adjutant General
 Fire Safety Division 
 Alcohol and Tobacco Control Division 
 Missouri State Highway Patrol 
 Veterans Commission
 State Emergency Management Division
 Missouri Gaming Commission
 Inspector General

References

External links
Website: http://www.dps.mo.gov/ Missouri Department of Public Safety
Publications by or about the Missouri Department of Public Safety at Internet Archive.

State law enforcement agencies of Missouri